Charles Ray Malone (born July 8, 1965) is a former relief pitcher who played briefly for the Philadelphia Phillies during the  season. Listed at 6' 7", 250 lb., Malone batted and threw right-handed. He attended Arkansas State University.

In seven relief appearances, Malone posted a 3.68 ERA with two strikeouts in   innings of work. He did not have a decision or saves.

External links
Baseball Reference

Philadelphia Phillies players
Major League Baseball pitchers
Arkansas State University alumni
Baseball players from Arkansas
1965 births
Living people
People from Harrisburg, Arkansas
Three Rivers Raiders baseball players
Bend Phillies players
Clearwater Phillies players
Maine Phillies players
Reading Phillies players
Scranton/Wilkes-Barre Red Barons players